Ernesto da Conceição Soares (born 5 October 1979), simply known as Ernesto, is a Portuguese born Cape Verdean footballer who plays as goalkeeper for Mozambican Moçambola side Vilankulo F.C.

In the summer of 2009, he signed for A.D. Carregado, where he remained for one season following the club's relegation to the third tier.

In December 2012, Ernesto signed for Mozambican side Vilankulo F.C.

International career
He also plays for the Cape Verde national football team. He played all 6 matches in 2010 FIFA World Cup qualification and also played in the friendly against Malta.

References

External links
 
 
 

1979 births
Living people
Sportspeople from Setúbal
Association football goalkeepers
Citizens of Cape Verde through descent
Cape Verdean footballers
Cape Verde international footballers
Portuguese people of Cape Verdean descent
F.C. Alverca players
Primeira Liga players
Segunda Divisão players
Liga Portugal 2 players
Cypriot First Division players
G.D. Estoril Praia players
Doxa Katokopias FC players
Vilankulo F.C. players
Expatriate footballers in Cyprus
Portuguese expatriates in Cyprus
Expatriate footballers in Mozambique
Portuguese expatriates in Mozambique